The Gridiron Classic was an annual post-season college football game played from 2006 through 2009. It featured the conference champions from the Pioneer Football League (PFL) and Northeast Conference (NEC), conferences within NCAA Division I Football Championship Subdivision (FCS), formerly known as Division I-AA. The game did not have a set location; it was hosted at the home stadium of one of the participants, alternating between NEC and PFL each playing.

History
The Gridiron Classic was announced in May 2006, initially with a two-year agreement between conferences. The initial playing was set for November 18, 2006, then later re-scheduled to December 2, 2006, so teams invited to the Division I FCS playoffs would be known. Structurally, the Gridiron Classic was a bowl game, even through it did not use the word "Bowl" in its name. At the time, it was the only bowl game at the FCS level.

The Gridiron Classic matched up the PFL and NEC champions, unless one of the teams received an at-large bid to the playoffs, which did not happen during the seasons that the game was contested. Prior to 2010, the champions of the PFL and NEC did not receive automatic bids to the FCS playoffs. The NEC champion began receiving an automatic bid in 2010, and the PFL champion began receiving an automatic bid in 2013. Prior to the Gridiron Classic, the NEC had been tied to the ECAC Bowl, which ended in 2003.

In 2010, with the NEC champion receiving an automatic playoff bid, initial plans were to continue the Gridiron Classic with the second-place team from the NEC. However, the game was cancelled by August.

Game results

 host team

Most appearances
Teams with multiple appearances

Teams with a single appearance
Won: Butler, Dayton, San Diego

Lost: Central Connecticut, Jacksonville, Monmouth

Appearances by conference

Media coverage

References

External links
 2008 Gridiron Classic Highlights - Albany 28, Jacksonville 0 (12/6/08) via YouTube

Defunct college football bowls
2006 in sports in California
2007 in sports in Ohio
2008 in sports in New York (state)
2009 in sports in Indiana